Alcidodes is a genus of weevils in the family Curculionidae.

Species

 Alcidodes adustus Haaf, 1961
 Alcidodes agnatus Haaf, 1964
 Alcidodes albocinctus Blanchard, 1853
 Alcidodes alienus Haaf, 1961
 Alcidodes amandus Haaf, 1961
 Alcidodes amplus Haaf, 1961
 Alcidodes angustus Haaf, 1961
 Alcidodes arcanus Haaf, 1964
 Alcidodes artivittis Marshall, 1948
 Alcidodes asperatus Haaf, 1963
 Alcidodes avidus Haaf, 1964
 Alcidodes balachowskyi Hoffmann, 1962
 Alcidodes barbaricus Haaf, 1964
 Alcidodes basipennis Marshall, 1948
 Alcidodes baueri Haaf, 1963
 Alcidodes beatus Haaf, 1964
 Alcidodes biplagiatus Haaf, 1961
 Alcidodes blandus Haaf, 1963
 Alcidodes bruniqueli Roudier, 1957
 Alcidodes candidulatus Haaf, 1961
 Alcidodes carus Haaf, 1961
 Alcidodes castus Haaf, 1961
 Alcidodes caviventris Lyal, 2000
 Alcidodes cervinus Haaf, 1963
 Alcidodes comptus Haaf, 1960
 Alcidodes confusus Haaf, 1963
 Alcidodes connexus Haaf, 1964
 Alcidodes convexus (A.G.Olivier, 1791)
 Alcidodes cultratus Haaf, 1964
 Alcidodes cupidus Haaf, 1961
 Alcidodes curranae Lyal, 2000
 Alcidodes curtirostris Haaf, 1962
 Alcidodes curtus Haaf, 1964
 Alcidodes curvirostris Lyal, 2000
 Alcidodes daitoanus Kôno, 1942
 Alcidodes decretus Haaf, 1961
 Alcidodes delicatulus Haaf, 1961
 Alcidodes densus Haaf, 1963
 Alcidodes desertus Haaf, 1961
 Alcidodes diabolicus Haaf, 1961
 Alcidodes didymus Haaf, 1964
 Alcidodes dignus Haaf, 1961
 Alcidodes distinctus Haaf, 1961
 Alcidodes diversus Haaf, 1961
 Alcidodes drescheri Haaf, 1964
 Alcidodes effertus Haaf, 1964
 Alcidodes egregius Haaf, 1961
 Alcidodes elegans Guérin-Méneville, 1838
 Alcidodes eremitus Haaf, 1963
 Alcidodes erosus Haaf, 1960
 Alcidodes eruditus Haaf, 1961
 Alcidodes eugeniophilus Lyal, 1996
 Alcidodes excellens Haaf, 1961
 Alcidodes exornatus Chevrolat, 1880
 Alcidodes expansitarsis Lyal, 1996
 Alcidodes expansus Haaf, 1964
 Alcidodes fabricii (J.C.Fabricius, 1798)
 Alcidodes facetus Haaf, 1961
 Alcidodes falsus Haaf, 1964
 Alcidodes farinosus Haaf, 1961
 Alcidodes fervidus Haaf, 1961
 Alcidodes firmus Haaf, 1963
 Alcidodes flavoguttatus Marshall, 1939
 Alcidodes fornicatus Haaf, 1961
 Alcidodes fossor Haaf, 1964
 Alcidodes franzi Hoffmann, 1965
 Alcidodes freudei Haaf, 1963
 Alcidodes frigidus Haaf, 1961
 Alcidodes fugitus Lyal, 2000
 Alcidodes fulvocinctus Marshall, 1958
 Alcidodes generosus Haaf, 1964
 Alcidodes gibbipennis Haaf, 1961
 Alcidodes glabratus Haaf, 1962
 Alcidodes gonzoi Lyal, 2000
 Alcidodes graniger Haaf, 1961
 Alcidodes gymnasticus Lyal, 1996
 Alcidodes harmonicus Haaf, 1961
 Alcidodes herteli Haaf, 1963
 Alcidodes hispidus Haaf, 1961
 Alcidodes hoplomachus Lyal, 2000
 Alcidodes hospitus Haaf, 1964
 Alcidodes humatus Haaf, 1961
 Alcidodes humeralis Heller, 1940
 Alcidodes imitator Haaf, 1964
 Alcidodes immutatus Haaf, 1961
 Alcidodes indubitus Haaf, 1961
 Alcidodes inops Haaf, 1964
 Alcidodes inquietus Haaf, 1961
 Alcidodes janetae Lyal, 1996
 Alcidodes jucundus Haaf, 1961
 Alcidodes juglans Chao, 1980
 Alcidodes karelini Boheman
 Alcidodes korotyaevi Egorov, 1977
 Alcidodes lascivus Haaf, 1963
 Alcidodes lautus Haaf, 1961
 Alcidodes leechi Haaf, 1962
 Alcidodes lemniscatus Haaf, 1964
 Alcidodes lepidus Haaf, 1963
 Alcidodes leucospilus Erichson, 1834
 Alcidodes liae Alonso-Zarazaga, 2013
 Alcidodes liciatus Haaf, 1962
 Alcidodes lugubris Haaf, 1961
 Alcidodes macellus Haaf, 1962
 Alcidodes magnificus Haaf, 1960
 Alcidodes major Haaf, 1964
 Alcidodes micranthiphilus Lyal, 2000
 Alcidodes mirandus Haaf, 1961
 Alcidodes monstratus Haaf, 1964
 Alcidodes montanus Haaf, 1964
 Alcidodes morosus Haaf, 1964
 Alcidodes morulus Haaf, 1961
 Alcidodes murranus Marshall, 1942
 Alcidodes muticus Haaf, 1961
 Alcidodes nanus Haaf, 1964
 Alcidodes natalensis Haaf, 1961
 Alcidodes nigricollis Haaf, 1964
 Alcidodes nigritus Haaf, 1963
 Alcidodes nigrovinculatus Heller, 1940
 Alcidodes notabilis Haaf, 1961
 Alcidodes novellus Haaf, 1963
 Alcidodes nubilus Marshall, 1955
 Alcidodes nudiusculus Haaf, 1962
 Alcidodes ochraceus Haaf, 1963
 Alcidodes omissus Haaf, 1963
 Alcidodes opacus Haaf, 1963
 Alcidodes opulentus Haaf, 1961
 Alcidodes ornatus Haaf, 1961
 Alcidodes ostentatus Haaf, 1964
 Alcidodes paetus Haaf, 1961
 Alcidodes paradictodes Haaf, 1961
 Alcidodes parnassius Haaf, 1964
 Alcidodes paucus Haaf, 1961
 Alcidodes pauxillus Haaf, 1962
 Alcidodes perditor Haaf, 1963
 Alcidodes peregrinus Haaf, 1961
 Alcidodes personatus Haaf, 1964
 Alcidodes pindicus Haaf, 1961
 Alcidodes platysomus Haaf, 1963
 Alcidodes porosus Faust, 1894
 Alcidodes posticus Haaf, 1961
 Alcidodes praevius Haaf, 1963
 Alcidodes pretiosus Haaf, 1963
 Alcidodes profanus Haaf, 1961
 Alcidodes prolixus Haaf, 1963
 Alcidodes pulchellus Haaf, 1964
 Alcidodes pullus Haaf, 1961
 Alcidodes pumilus Haaf, 1962
 Alcidodes putus Haaf, 1964
 Alcidodes ramezei Lyal, 2000
 Alcidodes ramosus Haaf, 1963
 Alcidodes rectus Haaf, 1963
 Alcidodes reductus Haaf, 1963
 Alcidodes relictus Haaf, 1961
 Alcidodes remotus Haaf, 1961
 Alcidodes richteri Faust, 1892
 Alcidodes rotundulus Haaf, 1961
 Alcidodes ryoichii Kôno, 1942
 Alcidodes salebrosus Haaf, 1961
 Alcidodes sanctus Haaf, 1961
 Alcidodes saturnus Haaf, 1961
 Alcidodes scitus Haaf, 1963
 Alcidodes sedulus Haaf, 1964
 Alcidodes sejugatus Haaf, 1964
 Alcidodes semiroseus Hustache, 1956
 Alcidodes separandus Haaf, 1961
 Alcidodes serius Haaf, 1961
 Alcidodes serotinus Haaf, 1961
 Alcidodes shoreaphilus Lyal, 2000
 Alcidodes siccus Haaf, 1964
 Alcidodes simmondsi Haaf, 1963
 Alcidodes sobrinus Haaf, 1961
 Alcidodes solitarius Haaf, 1964
 Alcidodes sordidus Haaf, 1961
 Alcidodes speciosus Haaf, 1964
 Alcidodes speculator Haaf, 1963
 Alcidodes sterryorum Lyal, 2000
 Alcidodes stolzi Haaf, 1961
 Alcidodes supernus Haaf, 1964
 Alcidodes suratus Haaf, 1961
 Alcidodes tamsi Marshall, 1954
 Alcidodes tectus Haaf, 1961
 Alcidodes tenellus Haaf, 1962
 Alcidodes tentus Haaf, 1961
 Alcidodes terrosus Haaf, 1963
 Alcidodes tersus Haaf, 1963
 Alcidodes texatus Haaf, 1960
 Alcidodes themus Lyal, 2000
 Alcidodes thompsoni Haaf, 1962
 Alcidodes toyi Lyal, 2000
 Alcidodes tricolor Heller, 1940
 Alcidodes tumidus Haaf, 1961
 Alcidodes typicus Haaf, 1964
 Alcidodes umbrifer Haaf, 1963
 Alcidodes vadoni Hustache, 1956
 Alcidodes vafer Marshall, 1955
 Alcidodes vaticus Lyal, 2000
 Alcidodes venustus Haaf, 1964
 Alcidodes vernicatus Haaf, 1961
 Alcidodes vicarius Haaf, 1961
 Alcidodes vicinus Haaf, 1961
 Alcidodes virgatus Haaf, 1960
 Alcidodes vitellus Haaf, 1961
 Alcidodes vitiosus Haaf, 1964
 Alcidodes vividus Haaf, 1961
 Alcidodes vossi Haaf, 1962
 Alcidodes walliorum Lyal, 2000
 Alcidodes wirthi Haaf, 1964

References

External links
 Global species
  Zipcodezoo

Curculionidae genera
Alcidinae